Aulds is a surname. Notable people with the surname include:

Leslie Aulds (1920–1999), American baseball player
Lonnie O. Aulds (1925–1984), American businessman and politician

See also
 Auld (surname)